The 2017 World Series of Boxing was the seventh edition of the World Series of Boxing since its establishment in 2010. It was held from February 3 to May 15 of 2017. The event was organised by the International Boxing Association (AIBA). The twelve teams, divided into three groups of four, contain a majority of boxers from the country in which they are based along with a smaller number of overseas boxers.

Astana Arlans earn third World Series of Boxing title.

Teams

 Argentina Condors
 Astana Arlans
 British Lionhearts
 Caciques de Venezuela
 China Dragons
 Colombia Heroicos
 Cuba Domadores
 France Fighting Roosters
 Italia Thunder
 Morocco Atlas Lions
 Patriot Boxing Team
 Uzbek Tigers

Group stage

Group A

Group B

Group C

Play-offs

References

World Series of Boxing
2017 in boxing